Catullus 85 is a poem by the Roman poet Catullus for his lover Lesbia. 

Ōdī et amō. Quārē id faciam fortasse requīris.
Nesciŏ, sed fierī sentiō et excrucior.
I hate and I love. Why I do this, perhaps you ask.
I know not, but I feel it happening and I am tortured.

Its declaration of conflicting feelings, "I hate and I love", is renowned for its drama, force and brevity.

The meter of the poem is the elegiac couplet. 

 –  u  u /  –   –  /   –   u u / –   –  /  –  u  u /   – –
 Ōd'et a / mō. Quā / r'id faci / am for / tasse re / quīris.
  
  – u u  /  –  u u /  – /  –   u  u  / –   u  u  / –
 Nesciŏ, / sed fie / rī / sen ti' et / ex cru ci / or.

Musical settings
 "Odi et amo", No. 19 of Moralia by Jacobus Gallus
 "Odi et amo", part of Catulli Carmina by Carl Orff
 "Odi et amo" by Jóhann Jóhannsson's album Englabörn
 "Wrecking Ball" (Miley Cyrus), adaptation with Catullus 85 by Eric Whitacre, performed by Eric Whitacre Singers and Marius Beck; performed live and recorded at the 2014 iTunes Festival in London

References

C085
Love poems